Mary Allen Wright (December 3, 1868 – March 31, 1948) was an American politician who was one of the first three women elected to the Idaho Legislature.She represented Kootenai County. She served three terms in the Idaho House of Representatives as a member of the Populist Caucus from 1899-1905. She was elected as leader of the Populist caucus, becoming the first woman to lead a party in any state legislature, as well as the first female nominee for the speakership.

References

Women state legislators in Idaho
1868 births
1948 deaths
People from Nodaway County, Missouri
Members of the Idaho House of Representatives
Idaho Populists
20th-century American politicians
20th-century American women politicians